The 1988 Gloucester City Council election took place on 3 May 1988 to elect members of Gloucester City Council in England.

Results  

|}

Ward results

Barnwood

Barton

Eastgate

Hucclecote

Kingsholm

Linden

Longlevens

Matson

Podsmead

Tuffley

Westgate

References

1988 English local elections
1988
1980s in Gloucestershire